Michel Barnier (born 9 January 1951) is a French politician who served as the European Commission's Head of Task Force for Relations with the United Kingdom (UK Task Force/UKTF) from 2019 to 2021. He previously served as Chief Negotiator, Task Force for the Preparation and Conduct of the Negotiations with the United Kingdom under Article 50 TEU (Task Force 50/TF50) from October 2016 to November 2019.

Barnier has served in several French cabinet positions including Minister of Agriculture and Fisheries from 2007 to 2009, Minister of Foreign Affairs from 2004 to 2005, Minister of State for European Affairs from 1995 to 1997 and minister of the environment from 1993 to 1995. He served at European level as European Commissioner for Regional Policy from 1999 to 2004 and European Commissioner for Internal Market and Services from 2010 to 2014. He served as vice president of the European People's Party (EPP) from 2010 to 2015.

In August 2021, Barnier announced his candidacy for President of France in the 2022 French presidential election but ultimately failed to win sufficient support at the Republicans' 2021 congress.

Early life and education 
Barnier was born at La Tronche in the French Alps, into a Gaullist family in 1951. His father was a leather and textiles craftsman. In his youth, Barnier was a scout and choirboy. Barnier graduated from the École Supérieure de Commerce de Paris in 1972.

Political career

National politics 

Barnier served on the staff of various Gaullist ministers in the 1970s, before being elected in 1978, aged 27, to the French National Assembly as deputy for the Department of Savoie representing the neo-Gaullists, Rally for the Republic (RPR), serving until 1993.

Together with Jean-Claude Killy, Barnier organised the 1992 Winter Olympics in Albertville as co-president of the COJO (Comité d'Organisation des Jeux Olympiques).

Barnier first joined the French Cabinet as Minister of the Environment following the Right's landslide victory in the 1993 legislative election. In 1995, Jacques Chirac appointed him secretary of state for European affairs, serving as such until the defeat of the presidential majority in the 1997 legislative election. Barnier then served as a European Commissioner for Regional Policy in the Prodi Commission from 1999 until 31 March 2004. Then he served as Foreign Minister of France in Jean-Pierre Raffarin's government until 5 June 2005 when Dominique de Villepin replaced him with Philippe Douste-Blazy. He considered he was unjustly sanctioned for the victory of the "No" in the French referendum over the European Constitution.

In March 2006, Barnier was elected vice president of the European People's Party (EPP) for a three-year term. Under Nicolas Sarkozy's presidency, upon the reshuffle of the French cabinet, caused by the resignation of Alain Juppé after the 2007 French legislative election, he re-joined the French Cabinet as Minister of Agriculture.

In 2016, the French investigating judge Sabine Kheris requested that the case of Barnier, Dominique de Villepin and Michèle Alliot-Marie be referred to the Court of Justice of the Republic. These former ministers were suspected of having allowed the exfiltration of the mercenaries responsible for the attack on the Bouaké camp in 2004, killing nine French soldiers. The operation was allegedly intended to justify a response operation against the Laurent Gbagbo government in the context of the 2004 crisis in Ivory Coast.

European politics 
Barnier worked in 2006 as a special adviser to José Manuel Barroso, then President of the European Commission, and presented a report to the Council of Ministers proposing the creation of a European civil-protection force. In 2006–2007, he served as member of the Amato Group, a group of high-level European politicians unofficially working on rewriting the Treaty establishing a Constitution for Europe into what became known as the Treaty of Lisbon following its rejection by French and Dutch voters.

Barnier led the UMP list in Ile-de-France for the 2009 European Parliament election. In February 2010 he was confirmed as European Commissioner for Internal Market and Services. In charge of European banking system reform, he argued for a "coherent single market with intelligent rules that apply everywhere".

Barnier was twice appointed Acting Commissioner for Industry and Entrepreneurship in Antonio Tajani's stead, from 19 April 2014 to 25 May 2014 while he was on electoral campaign leave for the 2014 elections to the European Parliament and from 1 July 2014 to 16 July 2014 after he took up his seat.

As European Commissioner for Internal Market and Services, Barnier handled many important issues, such as the reform of the financial sector (40 pieces of legislation between 2010 and 2014), the banking union (starting with the Single Supervisory Mechanism) and the digital single market.

From 2015, Barnier served as unpaid special adviser on European defence policy to President of the European Commission Jean-Claude Juncker.

Brexit negotiator 

On 27 July 2016, Barnier was announced as the European Commission's chief negotiator with the United Kingdom over leaving the European Union, under Article 50 of the Treaty on European Union. Commenting on the appointment, Juncker said: "I wanted an experienced politician for this difficult job."

For the 2020 Trade deal negotiation between the UK and EU, Barnier was the main negotiator, who received his negotiating mandate from the European Council on 25 February 2020.

Later career 
In January 2021, Barnier was appointed special adviser to President Ursula von der Leyen overseeing the ratification of the EU-UK Trade and Cooperation Agreement, under new arrangements that handed responsibility for implementing the agreement to Vice President Maroš Šefčovič.

In February 2021, Barnier set up a political faction within the Republicans under the name “Patriot and European” in preparation for a possible bid in the 2022 French presidential election.

On 27 August 2021, Barnier launched his presidential campaign. In particular, he wants a three- to five-year moratorium on immigration to the European Union. He proposes to "immediately stop regularizations, rigorously limit family reunification, reduce the reception of foreign students and the systematic execution of the double penalty ". On economic issues, he wants to raise the retirement age from 62 to 65, increase the working week and tighten the conditions for access to social assistance. At the party's 2021 congresse, however, he only came in third after Éric Ciotti and Valérie Pécresse; he subsequently endorsed Pécresse.

Other activities 
 International Olympic Committee (IOC), member of the Sustainability and Legacy Commission
 Friends of Europe, member of the board of trustees

Honours & Decorations

National honours
  : Officer of the Légion d'honneur
  : Commander of the Ordre du Mérite Agricole
  : Commander of the Ordre du Mérite Maritime

Foreign honours
  : Commander of the Order of the Oriental Republic (Uruguay)
  : Grand Cross of the Order of Merit (Germany)
  : Grand Cross of the Order of Prince Henry (Portugal)
  : Grand Cross of the Order of Isabella the Catholic (Spain)
  : Grand Cross of the Order of Merit (Italy)
  : Grand Cross of the Order of the Star (Romania)
  : Commander of Polonia Restituta (Poland)
  : Knight of the Order of Orange-Nassau (Netherlands)
  : Cross of Merit pro Merito Melitensi (SMOM)

References

External links 

 Michel Barnier – Head of EU Commission Taskforce for Brexit
 Personal Website at the European Commission (2010–2014)

|-

|-

|-

|-

|-

|-

1951 births
Brexit
ESCP Europe alumni
French European Commissioners
French Foreign Ministers
French Ministers of Agriculture
French Ministers of the Environment
French Secretaries of State for European Affairs
Grand Crosses with Star and Sash of the Order of Merit of the Federal Republic of Germany
Recipients of the Order pro Merito Melitensi
Living people
MEPs for Île-de-France 2009–2014
Officiers of the Légion d'honneur
People from La Tronche
Rally for the Republic politicians
Senators of Savoie
Union for a Popular Movement MEPs
Members of Parliament for Savoie